Giacomo Oddi (11 November 1679 - 2 May 1770) was an Italian archbishop and cardinal.

Biography
He was born to a local aristocratic family in Perugia and was ordained a priest on 30 May 1723. He was appointed titular archbishop of Laodicea in Phrygia, and was consecrated a bishop on 24 June 1732. On 9 September 1743 he was made a cardinal by pope Benedict XIV, who gave him the titulus of San Girolamo dei Croati on 5 April 1745. He later took part in the 1758 conclave.

On 22 September 1749 he was made archbishop ad personam of Viterbo and Tuscany, an office he held until his death. On 12 January 1756 he was given the titulus of Sant'Anastasia, which he exchanged on 22 November 1758 for that of Santa Maria in Trastevere and on 12 February 1759 for that of Santa Prassede. He finally settled on the titulus of San Lorenzo in Lucina on 21 March 1761 and served as protopresbyterian cardinal from 1763 until his death in Viterbo in 1770. He was buried in Viterbo Cathedral.

References

External links
 
 

1679 births
1770 deaths
18th-century Italian cardinals
Bishops of Viterbo
People from Perugia